Nebria composita composita is a subspecies of ground beetle in the Nebriinae subfamily that can be found in Qinghai province and Tibet.

References

composita composita
Beetles described in 1993
Beetles of Asia
Endemic fauna of China